Vaucourtois is a commune of the Seine-et-Marne department in the administrative region of Île-de-France, France.

Demographics
Inhabitants of Vaucourtois are called Vaucourtoisiens (feminine: Vaucourtoisiennes).

See also
Communes of Seine-et-Marne

References

External links

Communes of Seine-et-Marne